XHKH-FM is a radio station on 91.7 FM in Querétaro, Querétaro. The station is owned by Respuesta Radiofónica and carries a pop format known as Top Music 91.7.

History
XHKH began as XEKH-AM 1020, receiving its concession on May 26, 1988. It launched in August of that year as "Radio Centro 1020", the start of what would be the third major radio group to operate in Querétaro.

References

Radio stations in Querétaro